Turning Back is the 2014 debut album by Egyptian musician Dina El Wedidi.  The album features guest performances by Mazaher and Gilberto Gil.  It received distribution from Kirkelig Kulturverksted and Valley Entertainment.

Track listing

References

External links
 Valley Entertainment (Western Release)
 Kirkelig Kulturverksted (Eastern Release)

2014 albums